Andrew Carroll (born 1969) is an American author.

Andrew Carroll may also refer to:

Andrew Carroll (ice hockey) (1985–2018), American professional ice hockey player 
Andy Carroll (born 1989), English footballer 
Andy Carroll (Australian footballer) (1906–1970), Australian rules footballer